DENIS-P J082303.1-491201 b (alias 2MASS J08230313-4912012 b) is a substellar object, classified as either an exoplanet or a brown dwarf, orbiting DENIS-P J082303.1-491201, an L1.5-type brown dwarf in the constellation Vela.

Discovery
 was discovered by Sahlmann et al. (2013) using the ESO telescopes at the La Silla Paranal Observatory. It is part of an ultracool binary system.

Properties
At , it is listed as among the most massive planets in the NASA Exoplanet Archive.

It orbits the nearby L1.5-type brown dwarf , which is % the mass of the Sun, and has an orbital period of about 246 days.

See also

 Deep Near Infrared Survey of the Southern Sky
 DENIS-P J1058.7-1548
 DENIS-P J1228.2-1547
 DENIS-P J020529.0-115925
 DENIS-P J101807.5-285931
 List of exoplanet extremes
 List of exoplanets discovered using the Kepler spacecraft

References

External links
DENIS Deep Near Infrared Survey of the Southern Sky

Binary stars
Brown dwarfs
Exoplanets discovered in 2013
Exoplanets detected by astrometry